Ziggy Alberts (born July 1994) is an Australian singer-songwriter. He is best known for his studio album Laps Around the Sun, which peaked at number 2 on the ARIA Charts for Australian Artist Albums in November 2018.

Early life
Ziggy Alberts was born in July 1994 and grew up on the Sunshine Coast, Queensland and was homeschooled until the age of 13. Alberts told Triple J "I was looking into dentistry and engineering – no creative stuff". On 31 December 2010, his parents gave the budding dentist a guitar as a graduation gift. He said "I wasn't planning to be a musician, so I was like 'Thanks for this present but…' They said, 'maybe it's time to explore songwriting, and it's just gone from there." Alberts attended public school on the Sunshine Coast and graduated when he was 16 years old.

Career

2011–2016: Career beginnings

Alberts picked up a guitar in 2011 and began busking down the East Coast of Australia. In 2012, he released his first self-released EP titled Feels Like Home. Shortly after, Alberts co-founded his own record label Commonfolk Records. In October 2013, he released his first studio album Made of Water and spent most of 2014 touring before releasing his second studio album Land & Sea in December 2014.

In October 2015, Alberts released the single "Runaway" Alberts said "Runaway is a song about reopening up a relationship that heavily affected my emotional trust, in order to become friends and heal those trust issues." In May 2016, Alberts released the 5-track EP Four Feet in the Forest; the EP highlights social and environmental issues. He performed 44 shows across Australia in 2016 with the "Start Over Summer Tour".

2017–2018: Laps Around the Sun

In 2017, Alberts toured 11 European countries as part of the "Tell Me European Tour", including festival performances in France (Fête de la Musique), Netherlands (Mundial Festival and Surfana Festival) and Germany (Bochum Total). In September 2017, Alberts released "Heaven", the first single from his forthcoming studio album. The song became his first song to make the ARIA Singles Chart, debuting and peaking at number 85. "Love Me Now" was released in May 2018, followed by "Laps Around the Sun" in August and "Stronger" in September 2018. In November 2018, Alberts released his third studio album Laps Around the Sun, which became his first charting album, peaking at number 9 on the ARIA Album Chart and number 2 on the ARIA Australian Artist Albums. The album is a metaphor about the Earth's rotation in a passionate message about the importance of protecting marine life.

2019: A Postcard from an Australian Summer and further singles
In July 2019, a live EP titled A Postcard from an Australian Summer was released. In August, a new single "Intentions (22)" was released.

On 19 December 2019, ARIA presented Alberts with gold certifications for six songs and platinum certification for two songs and an EP.

2020-2021: I Won't Give You Up and Searching for Freedom
In January 2020, Alberts released the single "Together", in response to the Australian Bushfire Crisis. The artist donated 10% of streaming income from the first month of this single release to organisations involved with the Bushfire relief.
 
In June 2020, Alberts released the single "Don't Get Caught Up". The single was criticized for its possible lyrical allusions to anti-vaccination and anti-5G conspiracy theories. Alberts responded to the controversy with social media posts in which he reiterated his opposition to, specifically, "…the potential for punishment and fines if people do not comply" with mask mandates and lockdowns enacted during the COVID-19 pandemic.

In August 2020, Alberts release a collaborative EP I Won't Give You Up with prolific Sydney Hip Hop duo, Horrorshow. 

In September 2020, Alberts released his fourth album, Truly Acoustic.

In November 2020, Ziggy Alberts announced details of his studio album Searching for Freedom, released on 19 March 2021.

In November 2021, Alberts announced his Commonfolk Records, had  signed a global distribution deal with Ingrooves Music. On 5 November 2021, Alberts released "I Believe".

2022: Dancing in the Dark
In May 2022, Alberts announced the forthcoming release of his fifth studio album, Dancing in the Dark. The album is due for release on 4 November 2022.

Discography

Albums

EPs

Singles

Other certified songs

Awards

ARIA Music Awards
The ARIA Music Awards is an annual ceremony presented by Australian Recording Industry Association (ARIA), which recognise excellence, innovation, and achievement across all genres of the music of Australia. They commenced in 1987.

! 
|-
| 2021|| Searching for Freedom || ARIA Award for Best Blues and Roots Album || 
| 
|-

APRA Awards
The APRA Awards are held in Australia and New Zealand by the Australasian Performing Right Association to recognise songwriting skills, sales and airplay performance by its members annually. Alberts has been nominated for one award.

|-
| 2019
| "Love Me Now"
| Song of the Year
| 
|-
| 2020
| "Laps Around the Sun"
| Most Performed Blues & Roots Work of the Year
| 
|-
|2021 || "Together" || Most Performed Blues & Roots Work of the Year|| 
|-
|2022 || "Letting Go" || Most Performed Blues & Roots Work of the Year|| 
|-

References

External links

21st-century Australian male singers
APRA Award winners
Australian pop singers
Living people
1994 births